Florian Święs (born September 24, 1939) is a full professor of Biology and Earth Sciences at the Maria Curie-Skłodowska University. In 1992 he became the Head of the Geobiology Division at the Institute of Biology.

He received his MA from UMCS in 1962, his Ph.D in 1968, and became a professor in 1992.

Books 

 Święs F. (1982a). Geobotaniczna charakterystyka lasów dorzeczy Jasiołki i Wisłoka. Przemyśl; Rzeszów: Towarzystwo Przyjaciół Nauk; Krajowa Agencja Wydawnicza.  
 Święs F. (1982b). Charakterystyka geobotaniczna lasów Beskidu Niskiego. Przemyśl: Towarzystwo Przyjaciół Nauk w Przemyśle. 
 Święs F. (1983). Zbiorowiska leśne dorzecza Wisłoki w Beskidzie Niskim. Warszawa: PWN.  
 Święs F. (1985). Fitosocjologiczna charakterystyka lasów dorzecza Ropy w Beskidzie Niskim. Warszawa: PWN.  
 Święs F. (1993). Roślinność synantropijna miasta Rzeszowa. Lublin: Wydaw. UMCS. .
 Święs F. (1994). A Survey of Ruderal Vegetation in Poland: Phytocenoses with Reynoutria sachalinensis.
 Święs F. (1995). A Survey of Ruderal Vegetation in Poland: Phytocenoses with Rudbeckia laciniata L., Solidago canadensis L. and S. gigantea Aiton. Ann. Univ. MCS.
 Święs F. (1997). A Survey of ruderal vegetation in Poland: phytocenoses with Lycium barbarum L. Ann. Univ. MCS.
 Święs F., Kwiatkowska-Farbis M. (1998). Roślinność synantropijna miasta Łukowa. Synanthropic Vegetation of Łuków City. Lublin: Wydawnictwo UMCS.  
 Święs F., Kwiatkowska-Farbiś M. (1998): Synanthropic Vegetation of Łuków City. Lublin: Wydawnictwo UMCS.  
 Święs F., Kalicka M. (2001). Struktura i funkcjonowanie biosfery. Sandomierz: Wyd. Tow. Naukowe Sandomierskie.
 Święs F., Święs P. (2001). Struktura i funkcjonowanie biosfery. II. Hydrosfera. Sandomierz : Wyższa Szkoła Humanistyczno-Przyrodnicza. 
 Święs F., Wrzesień M. (2005). The role of railway grounds in the areas of the Lublin-Lvov Upland and Volhynian-Podolian Upland in the expansion of anthropophytes of Poaceae family. Lublin: Wydawnictwo UMCS. 
 Święs F., Wrzesień M. (2006). Flora and vascular plants communities of railway areas of the western part of the Lublin Upland. Lublin: Wydawnictwo UMCS.

References

External links
 Maria Curie-Skłodowska University, Official Website
 Polish Literary Bibliography, Official Website

1939 births
Living people
Polish biologists
20th-century Polish botanists
Geobiologists
21st-century Polish botanists